Chaullin Island may refer to:
 Chaullin Island (Calbuco)
 Chaullin Island (Chiloe)